The Boston Breakers was a professional soccer team that played in the Women's United Soccer Association. The team played at Nickerson Field on the campus of Boston University in Boston, Massachusetts.

History
The Boston Breakers began play in 2001. The team held a "name the team" contest that fifteen-year-old Laura DeDonato of Easton, Massachusetts won with the name "Boston Breakers."

In the final season in the WUSA, the Breakers had their best record (10-4-7) and placed first in the regular season before losing to the Washington Freedom in the semifinals.

Awards
The Breakers won the Community Service Award and held league-leading attendance in 2002.  Honors received in 2003 included:

 Maren Meinert - WUSA MVP
 Maren Meinert - All Star Game MVP
 Maren Meinert, Dagny Mellgren, Kristine Lilly - All-WUSA, 1st Team
 Angela Hucles, Kate Sobrero, Karina LeBlanc - All-WUSA, 2nd Team
 Joe Cummings - Executive of the Year
 Pia Sundhage - Coach of the Year

League suspension
The Women's United Soccer Association announced on September 15, 2003 that it was suspending operations.

In 2007, the Boston Breakers were re-established in the Women's Professional Soccer (WPS).  After the WPS folded in 2012, the Boston Breakers joined the inaugural WPSL Elite.

Players

2003 Roster

 Coach: Pia Sundhage

Year-by-Year Regular Season Record

See also

 Boston Breakers
 Women's professional sports
 List of soccer clubs in the United States
 Women's association football

References

 
Women's soccer clubs in the United States
Women's United Soccer Association teams
2000 establishments in Massachusetts
2003 disestablishments in Massachusetts